Devarapalem is a village located in Chimakurthi mandal of Prakasam district in the state of Andhra Pradesh, India.

References

Villages in Prakasam district